Onyang Bang clan is a Korean clans. Their Bon-gwan is in Asan, South Chungcheong Province. , there are about 80445 members of this clan. After that, he settled in Sangju.

See also 
 Korean clan names of foreign origin

References

External links 
 

 
Korean clan names of Chinese origin
Bang clans